Death of a Hollow Man is a detective novel by English writer Caroline Graham published by Century in 1989. The story follows Chief Inspector Tom Barnaby investigating the murder of a stage actor during an ongoing play. It is the second volume in Graham's Chief Inspector Barnaby series, preceded by The Killings at Badger's Drift and followed by Death in Disguise. It has been adapted into an episode in the ITV drama Midsomer Murders.

Plot summary
While attending an amateur production of Amadeus to watch his wife, Joyce's performance, Chief Inspector Barnaby witnesses the gruesome, all-too realistic murder of an actor on stage, after the tape applied to blunt the razor blade used to slit his character's throat is removed, revealing the lethal blade.

As he investigates the shocking crime, Barnaby unearths a whole host of dark passions and resentments nestling beneath the surviving cast's genial facade.

Publication history 
United Kingdom: 1989, Century (imprint of Random House), London, 1989, Hardback, 272 p., .
United States: 1989, Morrow, New York City, 1989, Hardback, 268 p., .

Reception
Publishers Weekly stated in its review of the novel: "A most enjoyable read, right down to the classic gathering of all the suspects at which Barnaby reveals the killer and the motive." Of Graham's writing, Kirkus Reviews noted: "Graham surely knows her way around the village mystery, touching on all its earmarks: the gossip, the small-mindedness, the noses in everybody's business. And her theatrics ring true. But familiarity, in her case, does not quite equal originality. A middling cozy, then, that needs a few inspired jolts." Elaine Kendall, a book critic of the Los Angeles Times expressed: "As a satire on amateur theater and the idiosyncratic types who invade it, “Death of a Hollow Man” is often amusing, faltering only when author Caroline Graham reaches for the archly dated style of Allingham, Christie or Marsh. Using Tim and Avery for campy comic relief also seems a tad passe."

Television adaptation
The novel was adapted into the third episode of season one of Midsomer Murders, starring (alongside regulars John Nettles and Daniel Casey) Bernard Hepton, Debra Stephenson, Janine Duvitski, Angela Pleasence, Nicholas Le Prevost and John Cater.

References

1989 British novels
Inspector Barnaby series
English novels
Novels about actors
Century (imprint) books